Luděk Zdráhal (born 12 September 1969) is a retired football striker.

Club career
Born in Prostějov, Zdráhal began playing football with local side SK Prostějov. He had spells in the Czech 2. liga with LeRK Brno, Prostějov and FC Bohemians Praha. He also made 80 appearances in the Czech Gambrinus liga with FC Baník Ostrava, Bohemians and SK Sigma Olomouc.

In November 1999, Göztepe S.K. manager Jozef Jarabinský signed Zdráhal to play for the Süper Lig side for six months.  After his success as a goal-scorer in the 2. liga, Olomouc had hopes of Zdráhal reproducing his form in the first division when they signed him in 2000. After struggling for playing time, Zdráhal went on loan to FK Zlín in 2002.

References

External links

Profile at TFF

1969 births
Living people
Czech footballers
FC Baník Ostrava players
Bohemians 1905 players
SK Sigma Olomouc players
FC Fastav Zlín players
Göztepe S.K. footballers
Association football forwards
Sportspeople from Prostějov